Al Irshad Club Chehim  is a football club based in Shheem, Lebanon, that competes in the . Founded in 1992, the club was officially licensed in 2009. Irshad Chehim won a Lebanese Fifth Division and a Lebanese Fourth Division, respectively in 2013 and 2016.

History 
Irshad Chehim were founded in 1992, receiving their official license on 9 November 2009. In the 2012–13 season, the club won the Lebanese Fifth Division and gained promotion to the Lebanese Fourth Division. After two seasons, in 2015–16 they won the league title, gaining promotion to the Lebanese Third Division.

The club participated in the 2018–19 Lebanese FA Cup as one of three Third Division sides. After beating Second Division side Egtmaaey Tripoli 2–1 in the first round, Irshad Chehim qualified to the second round, where they lost 2–1 to Taqadom Anqoun. The following season, Irshad Chehim played in the 2019–20 Lebanese FA Cup as one of two Third Division clubs; they were defeated 1–4 by Mabarra.

Honours 
 Lebanese Fourth Division
 Winners (1): 2015–16

 Lebanese Fifth Division
 Winners (1): 2012–13

See also 
 List of football clubs in Lebanon

References 

Football clubs in Lebanon
Association football clubs established in 2009
2009 establishments in Lebanon